TV & Satellite Week is a television listings magazine published in the United Kingdom by Future Publishing. Its focus is on quality dramas, comedy and documentaries, films and sport.

TV & Satellite Week belongs to Future Publishing's family of television magazines, acquired from TI Media, which include What's on TV and TV Times, as well as the soap bi-monthly Soaplife. Former titles include TV Easy.

References

External links 
 What's on TV
 TV & Satellite Week profile

1993 establishments in the United Kingdom
Listings magazines
Magazines established in 1993
Magazines published in London
Television magazines published in the United Kingdom
Weekly magazines published in the United Kingdom